Iver Skaarseth (born 15 March 1998) is a Norwegian cyclist, who currently rides for amateur team Above & Beyond Cancer Cycling p/b Bike World.

His brother Anders is also a professional cyclist.

Major results
2018
 2nd Road race, National Under-23 Road Championships
2020
 8th Overall International Tour of Rhodes

References

External links

1998 births
Living people
Norwegian male cyclists
Sportspeople from Lillehammer